Ethyl azide is an explosive compound sensitive to rapid heating, shock or impact. It has exploded when heated to room temperature.

It is irritating to eyes, respiratory system and skin.

Uses
Ethyl azide is used for organic synthesis.

References

Organoazides
Explosive chemicals
Liquid explosives